The Alta landslide occurred on June 3, 2020 in the locality of Kråkneset, Talvik, in the municipality of Alta in northern Norway. The landslide developed on a marine clay substrate that had originally formed in the early Holocene epoch when the area was under sea level. This substrate is thought to have turned into quick clay leading to landslide. 

The landslide was filmed by a resident. There were no casualties, but several homes and cabins were lost, and a dog was rescued from the sea.

Residents had alerted the authorities about a small landslide five days before the larger event happened. Three days after the initial landslide, a second landslide destroyed part of the coastal highway.

See also 
List of landslides

References

Landslides in Norway
Landslides in 2020
Alta, Norway
2020 in Norway
June 2020 events in Norway